The following is a list of songs known to have been recorded by Australian rock band AC/DC. Since 1974, they have released 16 studio albums (14 available worldwide and 2 released only in Australia), 2 soundtrack albums, 4 live albums, 11 video albums, and 2 box set albums. Although a large number of AC/DC singles have been released, the band always refused to release any greatest hits type packages; Who Made Who (which served as the soundtrack to Stephen King's Maximum Overdrive), Iron Man 2, and the band's various live recordings are as close as the group have come to such a compilation. AC/DC albums are available to download from Verizon, but for several years the band refused to release their albums on iTunes, as iTunes normally allows downloading of individual tracks; AC/DC publicly stated, "Our ... reason is that we honestly believe the songs on any of our albums belong together. If we were on iTunes, we know a certain percentage of people would only download two or three songs from the album – and we don't think that represents us musically." However, the band finally released their entire discography to iTunes in November 2012. Finally, they also released their music to Spotify in June 2015, though they previously refused to do so.

AC/DC was formed in 1973 by brothers Angus and Malcolm Young, and released two albums in Australia before releasing their first international effort, High Voltage with vocalist Bon Scott, bassist Mark Evans and drummer Phil Rudd. In 1980, Bon Scott died less than a year after the release of the successful Highway to Hell, and was replaced by British singer Brian Johnson, with whom AC/DC released their best selling album, Back in Black. Their latest album to date, Power Up, was released in 2020, selling 1.4 million copies by 2021. In 48 years of their career, AC/DC sold over 200 million albums worldwide, roughly 75 million in the US. Back in Black alone sold 25 million in the US (50 million worldwide), and is the second highest-selling album of all time.

List

Notes

References

External links
AC/DC — Official Site

 
AC DC